Leionema diosmeum is a shrub species in the family Rutaceae that is endemic to southern New South Wales, Australia. It has an upright habit, stems with fine soft hairs, variable shaped leaves and yellow flowers from late winter to spring.

Description
Bears clusters of yellow flowers in spring.

Taxonomy
Leionema diosmeum was first formally described by Paul G. Wilson and the description was published in Nuytsia.

Distribution and habitat
This species grows on sandstone in dry sclerophyll forest and heath south of the Royal National Park in New South Wales.

References

diosmeum
Sapindales of Australia
Flora of New South Wales
Taxa named by Paul G. Wilson